Johan Backman (1706–1768) was a Finnish painter.

Backman was primarily commissioned to paint religious-themed murals and altarpieces for churches. In 1749 he painted the altar wall for the Kaarlela church in Kokkola. He painted the church pulpit in the Lohtaja church in 1758. Between 1755 and 1761 he painted works for the Kruunupyyn Church in Jalasjärvi. In 1756 he executed altar paintings for the church in Saarijärvi.

References
 J. R. Aspelin: Johan Backman. Pohjalainen church painter. Finnish Museum Journal of 1903: 1, 20
 Some content translated from corresponding Finnish Wikipedia website

1706 births
1768 deaths
18th-century Finnish painters
18th-century male artists
Finnish male painters